Miss Grand Brazil 2020 was the third edition of the Miss Grand Brazil beauty pageant, held on January 30, 2020, at the Dall'Onder Grande Hotel in Bento Gonçalves, Rio Grande do Sul. Twenty-two contestants, who qualified for the national stage through state contests held by the Concurso Nacional de Beleza (CNB Brazil), competed for the title, of whom a 27-year-old medicine from Campina Grande representing the state of Paraíba, Lala Guedes, was elected the winner. She then represented Brazil at the Miss Grand International 2020 contest, previously scheduled to take place in Venezuela, held a year later on March 27, 2021, in Thailand, and was named the fourth runner-up.

The contest was showcased under the direction of Henrique and Marina Fusquine Fontes, presidents of the CNB Brazil, who have owned the Miss Grand Brazil license since 2015. The tournament's grand gala final was broadcast on the organizer's Youtube channel, TV CNB, as well as on the official Facebook page of its parent platform, Miss Grand International.

Competition
In the grand final competition held on January 30, the results of the preliminary competition—which consisted of the swimsuit and evening gown competition and the closed-door interview—determined the 15 semifinalists. The top 15 competed in the swimsuit round and were narrowed down to the top 12, who then competed in the evening gown round and were further cut down to the last nine finalists. The nine qualified candidates delivered a speech related to the pageant campaign, "Stop wars and violence," which determined the last five semifinalists, who then competed in the question and answer portion. After this, Miss Grand Brazil 2019 and her four runners-up were announced.

The summary of the selection process is shown below.

Result

Main placement

Special awards

Note
  Automatically qualified for the top 15 finalists after winning the fast tack, Miss Popularity.

Contestants
Twenty-two contestants competed for the title of Miss Grand Brazil 2020.

 – Fabyanna Albuquerque (Withdrew)
 – Ruthy Rafaella
 – Luisa Eliza Fonteles
 – Carolina Rodríguez (Withdrew)
 – Juliana Santana
 – Maria Eduarda Estrela
 – Mylena Duarte
 – Mariana David Pinheiro
 – Luciana Silva
 – Jéssica Dutkewicz
 – Amanda Andrade
 – Luísa Rocha
 – Vivian Henriques
 – Alaise Guedes
 – Clarissa Thomsen
 – Emily Chizoba
 – Jessica Nunes
 – Yanna Gomes
 – Natália Benchimol Maggi 
 – Allyne Macêdo 
 – Larissa Sevegnani
 – Isadora Meira
 – Caroline Andrade
 – Raiany Alves

References

External links

 

Miss Grand Brazil
Grand Brazil